L'Antre des esprits, released in the United States as The Magician's Cavern and in the United Kingdom as The House of Mystery, is a 1901 French short silent comedy film, directed by Georges Méliès. It is listed as numbers 345–347 in Star Film Company's catalogues.

Synopsis
A man enters his "cavern", and uses a human skeleton to do magic tricks. He first turns the skeleton into a scantilly-clad woman carrying a shield. He then transforms her into a well-dressed lady, whom he makes levitate. The magician proceeds to turn the woman back into a skeleton, and make the body dance. He dances with the skeleton, then takes him off screen. He then uses magic to move a table around the room, then levitates a stool, resting it upon the table.

The magician continues his show, attempting to catch four dancing spirits on his stage. He proceeds to make more furniture dance, before casting it all aside and flying through the ceiling. The man reappears, then tears off his clothes to reveal a fancy suit, before lighting a smoke and exiting the stage.

External links 
 
 Full video on YouTube

Films directed by Georges Méliès
French silent short films
French black-and-white films
Films about magic and magicians
French comedy short films
1901 comedy films
1901 short films
Silent comedy films
1900s French films